The Coming Ones is the third album by Chinese singer-songwriter Sa Dingding. Separate versions were released for the China  and international markets.

The Coming Ones includes traditional music from southwest China, as well as villagers of Xiaoshuijing singing Beethoven's Ninth Symphony.  The album also includes music created in collaboration with Paul Oakenfold.  Some songs are accompanied by music played on ancient instruments.

Some of the material on this album was reworked and included on the musician's later album Beyond Convention.

Version differences
Several differences exist between the initial release and international release of the album. The cover of the original release features an image of Sa Dingding with an elderly Tibetan woman. The international version of the album only features the artist in a folded-hand gesture.

The international version also reorders most of the tracks and replaces the track "Zhen Zhi Yan" (真之言) with "Peacock" and removes the track "Xing Zhe Wu Jiang" (行者無疆).

Stylistic differences between albums also results in difference of track lengths.

Track listing

Track listing (International release)

References

External links 
The Coming Ones, official site.

2012 albums
Sa Dingding albums